Prashant Pandey is a Mumbai-based writer director. He started his career writing Amitabh Bachchan's critically acclaimed Sarkar Raj (2008) featuring Amitabh Bachchan, Abhishek Bachchan and Aishwarya Rai.

Educated at Hansraj College University of Delhi, and AJK, Mass Communication Research Centre Jamia Millia Islamia, Prashant Pandey had a brief stint as a journalist for ANI-REUTERS and later as a creative head with Zee TV talent hunt SAREGAMAPA.

Filmography 
 Dil Dosti Etc (lyrics)
 Sarkar Raj (2008) (Screenplay, Dialogue and lyrics)
 Contract (2008) (Story, Screenplay, Dialogue and lyrics)
 Phoonk (2008) (lyrics)
 Agyaat (2009) (lyrics)
 Rann (2010)
 Rakta Charitra (2010) (Story, Screenplay and Dialogues)
 Turning 30 (2011) (lyrics)
 Always Kabhi Kabhi (2011) (lyrics)
 Bubble Gum (2011) (Lyrics)
 The Attacks of 26/11 (2013) (dialogue)
 Traffic (2016) (dialogue)
 Poorna: Courage Has No Limit (2017)
 Raid (2018)

External links 
 

Indian male screenwriters
Hindi-language film directors
Delhi University alumni
Jamia Millia Islamia alumni
Living people
Film directors from Mumbai
Year of birth missing (living people)